Juha Kylmänen (born 20 January 1981) is a Finnish singer who is the lead vocalist of gothic metal bands For My Pain... and Reflexion.

Discography

Studio albums 
 A Virgin and a Whore (2001, with Eternal Tears of Sorrow)
 Fallen (2003, with For My Pain...)
 Out of the Dark (2006, with Reflexion)
 Dead to the Past, Blind for Tomorrow (2008, with Reflexion)
 Edge (2010, with Reflexion)
 Asphyxia (2012, with Sangre Eterna)

Singles 
 "Killing Romance" (2004, with For My Pain...)
 "Undying Dreams" (2005, with Reflexion)
 "Crashing Down" (2006, with Reflexion)
 "Storm" (2006, with Reflexion)
 "Weak and Tired" (2008, with Reflexion)

References 

1981 births
Living people
Finnish heavy metal singers
People from Oulu
English-language singers from Finland
21st-century Finnish singers